David Andrew Roy White (born May 12, 1970) is an American actor, film director, screenwriter, film producer and businessman.  He is a co-founder of Pinnacle Peak Pictures, a distribution and production company specializing in Christian faith- and family-themed films. He is best known for his role as Reverend Dave in the God's Not Dead film series.

Personal life
White is the son of a Mennonite pastor. He was formerly married to the actress and producer Andrea Logan (born July 29, 1978), who played the role of his wife in the 2009 film In the Blink of an Eye.

Career
After his arrival in Los Angeles, White was given the role of Andrew Phillpot, the best friend of Burt Reynolds' son, in the CBS sitcom Evening Shade (1990–1994). White also had guest appearances in television series such as Coach, California Dreams, Sisters and Melrose Place. He was a protagonist, Dan Burgess, in Second Glance where his closing line "Hey Scotty, Jesus Man" turned into a meme.

Some of his early films were 20th Century Fox's The Visitation, an adaption of the novel by author Frank Peretti, Bells of Innocence with actor Chuck Norris, and Mercy Streets for which he was nominated for The MovieGuide Awards' Best Actor. In 2003 White starred alongside Jeffrey Dean Morgan in Six: The Mark Unleashed.

In 2005, he founded Pure Flix (Pinnacle Peak Pictures) with Michael Scott, Russell Wolfe and Elizabeth Travis.
Over the next several years, he produced and starred in several films including In the Blink of an Eye, Hidden Secrets, and The Moment After.

In 2011, he played Shane Daughtry in Jerusalem Countdown. In 2012, he played James in Brother White, Special Agent Ric Caperna in The Encounter:Paradise Lost (sequel to the 2011 film The Encounter, which he produced and directed) and pastor Rich Chaplin in Me Again, a film about a pastor unhappy with his life. He was nominated for a TCA best actor award.

In 2014, he co-starred as a pastor in the film God's Not Dead. He starred in and produced both sequels, God's Not Dead 2 (2016), God's Not Dead: A Light in Darkness (2018), but only starred in God's Not Dead: We the People (2021).
White also starred in the Pure Flix produced "Revelation Road" film series. White played a former government assassin turned Christian who struggles to survive a lawless post-Rapture wasteland.

In 2015, he played Wayne in Faith of Our Fathers, a film about veterans from the Vietnam War and the experiences of their families.

On March 27, 2018, a short compilation documentary Pure Flix and Chill: The David A.R. White Story about him by Anthony Simon was released on the Filmmaker Magazine website.

He created, produced, and starred in the sitcom Malibu Dan, the family man in 2018.

Filmography
Although White was an associate producer in the film End of the Harvest, The Moment After was the first film that he produced. White also played the role of Adam Riley in the film. He has produced other films such as The Visitation, The Wager, and Hidden Secrets. In 2012, he produced the historical drama Apostle Peter and the Last Supper starring Robert Loggia and Bruce Marchiano.

In 2010, White started directing films. His first film was The Encounter, about five strangers stranded at a diner being served by the owner, who claims to be Jesus, which starred Bruce Marchiano, Jaci Velasquez, and pro wrestler Steve "Sting" Borden.

His second film was Holyman Undercover, which starred David himself and Fred Willard. The last film White directed was Redeemed, released in 2014.

He produced the films God's Not Dead 2 and God's Not Dead: A Light in Darkness.

Film

Television

Writings
White published the book Between Heaven and Hollywood: Chasing Your God-Given Dream.

Awards and nominations

Movieguide Awards

See also
Kevin Downes

References

External links
Pure Flix and Chill: The David A.R. White Story on Filmmaker Magazine
Pure Flix Entertainment website

Living people
20th-century American male actors
21st-century American male actors
20th-century American businesspeople
21st-century American businesspeople
American Christians
American male film actors
American male screenwriters
American film production company founders
1970 births